Tori-Emaki (Japanese for "bird picture scroll") is an interactive emakimono developed by London Studio in association with Playlogic Entertainment for the PlayStation 3 platform, which utilizes the PlayStation Eye camera peripheral. It was released on the European PlayStation Store on November 1, 2007 and on the North American PlayStation Store on January 17, 2008.

Art, folklore and possibly history. Use hand gestures and whole body movements seen by the PS_EYE to direct your flock of birds from location to location within the panning scroll, left, right, up or down. Every location worthwhile of the flock's touch down has its own ambiance you need to allow to let sink in. Some detailed exploration is in order as you steer your flock.  Your flock shall OBSERVE human family life, struggle, war, and other worldly happenings in the japanese interpretation. Relaxation and wonder are key words here.

References

External links
 Official website

2007 video games
London Studio games
Playlogic Entertainment games
PlayStation 3 games
PlayStation 3-only games
PlayStation Eye games
PlayStation Network games
Single-player video games
Sony Interactive Entertainment games
Video games developed in the United Kingdom